Rupert Deen (born 14 November 1938) is a British luger. He competed in the men's singles event at the 1972 Winter Olympics.

References

1938 births
Living people
British male lugers
Olympic lugers of Great Britain
Lugers at the 1972 Winter Olympics
People from Berkhamsted